South Hamilton Street Row is a set of historic homes located at Poughkeepsie, Dutchess County, New York.  There are four contributing houses, built in 1871 or 1872, and a large period barn.  They represent popular architectural styles including a 2-story Second Empire style residence and -story Italian Villa.  The group is representative of upper middle class suburbs of the 1870s.

It was added to the National Register of Historic Places in 1982.

References

Houses on the National Register of Historic Places in New York (state)
Italianate architecture in New York (state)
Second Empire architecture in New York (state)
Houses completed in 1872
Houses in Poughkeepsie, New York
National Register of Historic Places in Poughkeepsie, New York